HRK may refer to:
 HRK (gene), a human gene
 Croatian kuna, the former currency of Croatia, replaced by euro in 2023
 German Rectors' Conference
 Haruku language, spoken in Indonesia
 Heidelberger RK, a German rowing club
 Heinz Rudolf Kunze (born 1956), German singer and writer
 Hirok railway station, in Balochistan, Pakistan
 Kharkiv International Airport, in Ukraine